Revolutionary Vanguard was a political party in Peru founded in 1965 by various Marxist groups. Leaders included Ricardo Napurí (who created it after participating to the MIR), César Benavides, Ricardo Letts, Edmundo Murrugarra and Walter Quinteros.

In 1977 VR took part in the foundation of the UDP. It participated in the 1978 elections on UDP lists.

In 1980 VR was one of the founding members of IU.

In 1984 VR merged with other groups to form the Mariateguist Unified Party (PUM).

References 

1965 establishments in Peru
1984 disestablishments in South America
Defunct political parties in Peru
Marxist parties
Political parties disestablished in 1984
Political parties established in 1965
Socialist parties in Peru